Hongxing (Mandarin: 红星乡) is a town in Zoige, Ngawa Tibetan and Qiang Autonomous Prefecture, Sichuan, China. In 2010, Hongxing had a total population of 6,592: 3,531 males and 2,061 females: 1,792 aged under 14, 4,379 aged between 15 and 65 and 421 aged over 65.

See also 
 List of township-level divisions of Sichuan

References 

Ngawa Tibetan and Qiang Autonomous Prefecture
Towns in Sichuan